God's Crucible (also known as The Foreigner) is a lost 1921 Canadian silent religious melodrama directed by Henry MacRae and written by Faith Green, based on a Ralph Connor novel called The Foreigner. The film was narrated by Ernest Shipman.

Plot 
A young political refugee flees to Winnipeg to escape Russian enemies, where his resolve is tested in the snow-capped mountains, his violin his only company. Eventually, he is rewarded for toughing it out.

Cast 
 Gaston Glass as Ivan Kalmar
 Gladys Coburn as Marjorie Menzies
 Wilton Lackaye as Michael Kalmar
 Edna Shipman as Irma Kalmar
 Anne Sutherland as Kalmars' Servant

Production 
The film was shot in and around Winnipeg.

References

External links

1921 films
Canadian silent films
Films directed by Henry MacRae
Films based on Canadian novels
Films shot in Winnipeg
1921 lost films
Lost Canadian films
Lost drama films